Peter Goldmark may refer to:

Peter Carl Goldmark (1906–1977), engineer and inventor
Peter C. Goldmark Jr. (born 1941), American environmentalist, publisher, financier, and executive director
Peter J. Goldmark (born 1946), rancher, geneticist and American politician